The surname Grande or Del Grande is a surname of Spanish or Italian origin and may refer to:
 Ariana Grande (born 1993), an American actress and singer
 Frankie Grande (born 1983), an American producer, dancer, actor, singer, contestant on the sixteenth season of Big Brother and Ariana Grande's brother
 George Grande, an American sportscaster who hosted the very first broadcast of SportsCenter on ESPN in 1979
 Johnny Grande (born John A. Grande, 1930–2006), a member of Bill Haley's backing band, The Comets
 Louis Del Grande (born 1943), a Canadian television writer and actor
 Mike Del Grande  (born  1953), a Canadian politician
 Rita Grande (born 1975), an Italian professional tennis player
 Rutilio Grande (1928–1977), a Salvadorian Jesuit priest
 Sandro Grande (born 1977), a Canadian soccer player 
 Sean Grande (born 1969), an American television and radio sportscaster
 Sidney Grande (1927–2016), an American football coach
 Svante Grände (1947–1975), a Swedish aid worker and guerrilla fighter in Latin America during the 1970s.
 Toni Grande (born 1947), a retired Spanish football player
 Tony Grande (1943–2006), a politician in Ontario, Canada

 stage names
 João Grande (born João Oliveira dos Santos, 1933), a Grão-Mestre of the Afro-Brazilian martial art of capoeira Angola
 Jono El Grande (born Jon Andreas Håtun, 1973), an autodidactic Norwegian composer, band leader, guitarist and conductor

See also
 Grande (disambiguation)

Italian-language surnames
Spanish-language surnames